Balajnac is a village in Serbia in the municipality Merošina in Nisava district. According to the census of 1991, there were 1,249 inhabitants.

Demographics
In the village Balajnac has a population of 944 adult inhabitants, and the average age is 40.1 years (39.5 for men and 40.7 for women). The village has 302 households, and the average number of members per household is 4.09.
This village is mainly inhabited by Serbs (according to the census of 2002) and in the last three censuses, there was a decline in population.

References

Populated places in Nišava District